The 2007 All-Ireland Intermediate Hurling Championship was the 24th staging of the All-Ireland Intermediate Hurling Championship since its establishment by the Gaelic Athletic Association in 1961. The championship began on 27 May 2007 and ended on 25 August 2007.

Cork entered the championship as the defending champions, however, they were beaten by Clare in the Munster quarter-final.

The All-Ireland final was played on 25 August 2007 at Nowlan Park in Kilkenny, between Wexford and Waterford, in what was their first ever meeting in the final. Wexford won the match by 1-11 to 1-09 to claim their fourth championship title overall and a first title since 2005.

Waterford's Shane Casey was the championship's top scorer with 5-13.

Team summaries

Results

Leinster Intermediate Hurling Championship

Leinster semi-final

Leinster final

Munster Intermediate Hurling Championship

Munster quarter-final

Munster semi-finals

Munster final

All-Ireland Intermediate Hurling Championship

All-Ireland semi-final

All-Ireland final

Championship statistics

Top scorers

Top scorers overall

Top scorers in a single game

Miscellaneous

 Waterford won the Munster title for the first time in their history.

References

Intermediate
All-Ireland Intermediate Hurling Championship